The John Day Formation is a series of rock strata exposed in the Picture Gorge district of the John Day River basin  and elsewhere in north-central Oregon in the United States. The Picture Gorge exposure lies east of the Blue Mountain uplift, which cuts southwest–northeast through the Horse Heaven mining district northeast of Madras. Aside from the Picture Gorge district, which defines the type, the formation is visible on the surface in two other areas: another exposure is in the Warm Springs district west of the uplift, between it and the Cascade Range, and the third is along the south side of the Ochoco Mountains. All three exposures, consisting mainly of tuffaceous sediments and pyroclastic rock rich in silica, lie unconformably between the older rocks of the Clarno Formation below and Columbia River basalts above.

Stratigraphy 
The strata, which vary in age from 39 million years to 18 million years, were formed mainly from ashfalls from volcanoes due to a series of calderas now linked to the Yellowstone hotspot. Some of the major layers within the group exposed in the Picture Gorge district are the Big Basin Formation and Bridge Creek Beds (35 to 32 million years), the Turtle Cove Formation (30 to 28 million years), the Picture Gorge Ignimbrite (28.7 million years), the Kimberly Formation (28 to 25 million years), and the Haystack Formation (25 to 18 million years).

Located in the general vicinity of what became the Cascade Range, the John Day volcanoes emitted large volumes of ash and dust, much of which settled in the John Day basin. The rapid deposition of the ash preserved the remains of plants and animals living in the region. Some of the solidified ash and the fossils they contain are found in the John Day Fossil Beds National Monument. Because ash and other debris fell during varied climatic and volcanic conditions and accumulated from many eruptions extending into the early Miocene (about 20 million years ago), the sediment layers in the fossil beds vary in their chemical composition and color. The lowermost layer contains red ash, such as that exposed in the Painted Hills Unit of the national monument. The layer above it is mainly pea-green clay. On top of the pea-green layer are buff-colored layers.

Paleontology 

Fossils found in the John Day Formation include a wide variety of plants and more than 100 species of mammals, including dogs, cats, oreodonts, horses, camels, and rodents.  Among the notable plant fossils are Metasequoia (Dawn Redwood), a genus thought to have gone extinct worldwide until it was discovered alive in China in the early twentieth century.

Among the paleobiota found in the formation is the Daeodon, whose type species, Daeodon shoshonensis, has been found in the formation.

Mammals

Apatotheres

Carnivorans

Eulipotyphlans

Metatherians

Rodents

Ungulates

Reptiles

Squamates

References

Bibliography 
 Orr, Elizabeth L., and Orr, William N. (1999). Geology of Oregon, 5th ed. Dubuque, Iowa: Kendall/Hunt Publishing Company. .

Geologic formations of Oregon
Neogene geology of Oregon
Eocene United States
Oligocene North America
Miocene United States
Sandstone formations of the United States
Tuff formations
John Day Fossil Beds National Monument